Santa Cruz de Chuca District is one of eight districts of the province Santiago de Chuco in Peru.

References

 
I love You Cashán From La Libertad PERÚ